Buzz Bee can refer to either of the following:

Buzz (mascot), mascot for the Georgia Tech Yellow Jackets, but occasionally referred to as "Buzz Bee"
Buzz Bee Toys, an American/Hong Kong toy company
BuzzBee, the mascot for Honey Nut Cheerios cereal

See also
Buzzy Bee, a children's ride in New Zealand